Khan Jajja is a village in Sialkot Tehsil, Sialkot District, Punjab, Pakistan.

Jajja (जज्ज) Jaja (जज) is a Muslim Jat clan found in Pakistan. Jaji (जजी) clan is found in Afghanistan.[1]

They are said to be descendants of King Jajja. We find mention of Jajja King of Kashmir 748-751 A.D. In history of Kashmir we also find mention of Jajja, lord of Vallapura, of the royal blood and of his own country, who helped Sussala in facing the enemies in 1121 AD.

Genealogy of Jajja

H.A. Rose[2] provides us the following genealogy as given by the Mirasi at Pandndwala in the Chiniot Tahsil of the Jhang District : —

Punwar. → Udadip. → Jagdeo.→ Karral.→ Gaidal.→ Sulangi. → Vimian. → Butta.→ Aira.→ Jajja.→ Jaisal.→ Ranu. → Khiva. → Kharral.→ Buddh.→ Gaddan.→ Deore.→ Udrath.→ Sareg.→ Jagsin. → Kaulra. → Vasu. + Visa.

History

Jajjah (जज्जाह) (and) Jathol (जथोल ), a tribe of Jats, found in Sialkot. They claim Solar Rajput origin and say that their ancestor, Jam, migrated from Multan. His two sons Jaj and Jathol founded villages in the Pasrur tahsil of Sialkot. Their mirasis are Posla, their Brahmans Badhar and their nais Khokhar by got. According to the Customary Law of Sialkot the Jajjah is distinct from the Jathaul.

References

Villages in Sialkot District